Babes in Toyland is a 1997 American Christmas animated musical comedy fantasy-adventure film based on the 1903 operetta. Directed by Charles Grosvenor, Toby Bluth, and Paul Sabella, the film stars Joseph Ashton, Lacey Chabert, Raphael Sbarge, Cathy Cavadini, Charles Nelson Reilly, Susan Silo, James Belushi, Bronson Pinchot, Christopher Plummer and Lindsay Schnebly. It was released direct-to-video in the United States.

Plot 
It's three days before Christmas, as the conductor aboard the Toyland Express, Humpty Dumpty (Charles Nelson Reilly), meets two children, Jill and Jack (Lacey Chabert and Joseph Ashton), who are on their way to Toyland. After meeting Tom Piper (Raphael Sbarge) and Mary (Cathy Cavadini), who runs her late father's toy factory, they go to live with their uncle, the evil Barnaby Crookedman (Christopher Plummer), who despises toys and keeps Jack and Jill in the tower. He has plans to shut down the toy factory, and earlier shot down Tom's hot air balloon as he was flying over the Goblin Forest in an attempt to get him eaten by goblins (and is quite shocked to see him alive).

Jack and Jill sneak out and go to the Toy Factory, which had received a big order from Santa Claus requesting a thousand giant toy soldiers. Just as Jack and Jill offer to help, Barnaby takes them back to the tower of his house and threatens to send them to the Goblin Forest if they go near the toy factory again. Shortly afterward, he hires two crooks (the pirates) named Gonzargo and Rodrigo (James Belushi and Bronson Pinchot) to sabotage the toy factory.

Jack and Jill sneak out and go to the toy factory again, where Gonzargo and Rodrigo, disguised as sheep, drop a monkey wrench into one of the machines, Jack manages to remove it before the machine can explode. Jack and Jill immediately suspect Gonzargo and Rodrigo, though believing them to be sheep, and chase after them, resulting in Rodrigo and Gonzargo being knocked into a well by a ram and Jack and Jill, respectively, get knocked down by an empty pail and fall down the hill again.

Barnaby catches Jack and Jill and orders Gonzargo and Rodrigo, who expose the children's interference with the sabotage, to take them to the Goblin Forest. There, they meet the mysterious Goblin King (Lindsay Schnebly) who tries eat Gonzargo and Rodrigo. Mr. Dumpty informs Tom and Mary, who go to the forest to rescue them. As the goblins are weak against light, they use a flashlight to fight them off and escape. Barnaby knocks Mr. Dumpty over a bridge (while giving a mockery saying of the nursery rhyme which bears the egg's name) for the key to the factory and tries to enter it, but is stopped by Tom, Mary, Jack, Jill, Gonzargo, and Rodrigo, and is forced to retreat.

As Tom and Mary finish the Toy Factory's order and fall in love, Barnaby leads the goblins to Toyland, where they invade, setting fire to the buildings and roasting Gonzargo and Rodrigo on a spit. Tom activates the toy soldiers, who soundly defeat the goblins and put out the fire, saving all of Toyland (including Gonzargo and Rodrigo). As Barnaby insults the Goblin King, who tries to kill him, but Jack, Jill, and all the toy soldiers shine lights on him, destroying the Goblin King. Barnaby calls him a "pathetic ogre", and the other goblins confront him and chase him off, out of Toyland (though whether they finally catch him and eat him is unclear).

Finally Christmas arrives; Tom has repaired Mr. Dumpty. Santa magically shrinks the toy soldiers down to the size of action figures and loads them into his bag. He notices Barnaby's cat, Scat, who is now homeless since Barnaby's disappearance; he picks her up and pets her. Jill asks for Scat, and just as she gets her, Santa continues on his journey.

In the end, Jack and Jill become the adopted children of Tom and Mary.

Cast 
 Lacey Chabert as Jill
 Joseph Ashton as Jack
 Raphael Sbarge as Tom Piper
 Cathy Cavadini as Mary
 Charles Nelson Reilly as Mr. Humpty Dumpty
 Susan Silo as Scat
 Jim Belushi as Gonzargo
 Bronson Pinchot as Rodrigo
 Christopher Plummer as Barnaby Crookedman
 Lindsay Schnebly as Goblin King
 Kevin Michael Richardson / Dee Bradley Baker / Beth Anderson (singer) / Amick Byram / Susan Boyd / Jon Joyce as additional voices (uncredited)
 Randy Crenshaw / Kevin Dorsey / Gary Falcone as Singing candles (uncredited)

Musical numbers 
 "Toyland" – Mr. Humpty Dumpty
 "Mr. Humpty Dumpty's Toyland / The Aerial Ballet" – Mr. Humpty Dumpty
 "Dream" – Jack, Jill, Tom Piper and Mary
 "The Factory Song" – Tom Piper, Mary and Company
 "A Crooked Man" – Barnaby Crookedman
 "The Worst Is Yet to Come" – Gonzargo and Rodrigo
 "It's You" – Tom Piper, and Mary
 "Toyland" (reprise) – Mr. Humpty Dumpty

Release 
MGM/UA Home Video released Babes in Toyland direct-to-video on October 14, 1997 when this film was actually meant to be released to theaters.

Reception 
TV Guide rated it 3/5 stars and called it "fine entertainment for its intended audience".  In criticizing its old source material as irrelevant to modern audiences, Bill Gibron of DVD Verdict described it as "a waste of time and talent".

See also
 List of Christmas films

References

External links 
 
 
 

1997 animated films
1997 direct-to-video films
1990s American animated films
1990s fantasy adventure films
1990s musical comedy films
1990s musical films
American children's animated adventure films
American children's animated comedy films
American children's animated fantasy films
American direct-to-video films
American children's animated musical films
American Christmas comedy films
American coming-of-age films
American fantasy adventure films
American musical comedy films
American musical fantasy films
Animated Christmas films
Animated coming-of-age films
Animated films about orphans
1990s English-language films
Direct-to-video animated films
Films about child abduction
Animated films about children
Animated films about siblings
Films about toys
Films directed by Charles Grosvenor
Films scored by Mark Watters
Metro-Goldwyn-Mayer animated films
Metro-Goldwyn-Mayer direct-to-video films
Films about sentient toys
1990s Christmas comedy films
1997 comedy films
Metro-Goldwyn-Mayer Animation films
Animated films about trains
Films directed by Paul Sabella